Chandrashekhar Dubey (4 September 1924 – 28 September 1993) commonly referred to as C. S. Dubey was an Indian actor and radio personality. He was born in Kannod and appeared in over 150 Hindi films as a character actor starting in 1950s, with Patita (1953) and  Mr. & Mrs. '55 (1955). He became famous for his one-liner "Dhakkan khol ke" in the film, Zinda Dil (1975), which he later used in his radio programs, as a suffix with almost every sentence.

Life 

Dubey was active in the Quit India movement for which he was imprisoned. He then moved to Bombay to work as an actor. He was also known as a social worker who helped poor students pay for their education.

Career
He first worked for producer and director Amiya Chakravarty as an office boy, production manager and assistant director before appearing in his two films Patita and  Seema (1955). He went on to appear in almost 200 films, for example Teesri Kasam, Roti Kapda Aur Makaan, Mausam, Angoor and Ram Teri Ganga Maili. He was known for mostly portraying negative characters, such as money lenders, pimps or rapists.

He worked for the radio and starred in radio programmes like Hawa Mahal, Fauji Bhaiyon and radio plays.

Filmography

 Film / Role / Year

Yaar Meri Zindagi / / (2008)
Hatya: The Murder/ Paid Mourner/ (2004)
Gair/ Mandir poojary/ (1999)
Share Bazaar/ Money lender/ (1997)
Sarhad: The Border of Crime/ / (1995)
Aatank Hi Aatank/ Durga Prasad Tiwari/ (1995)
Stunttman/ Jeweller/ (1994)
Eena Meena Deeka/ Eena's Neighbour/ (1994)
Shuruaat/ / (1993)
Dalaal/ Neta's man/ (1993)
Dhartiputra/ Secretary To Governor/ (1993)
Antim Nyay/ Lawyer/ (1993)
Naseebwaala/ Man who bought the garage/ (1992)
Narasimha/ Munshi/ (1991)
Iraada/ / (1991)
Vidrohi /Deshbandhu/ 1990
Karishma Kali Kaa/ Parvati's Advocate/ (1990)
Aag Ka Gola/ / (1990)
Ghar Ho To Aisa/  Mahajan/ (1990)
Sailaab/ Pandit/ (1990)
Jeevan Ek Sanghursh/ Roop Chand/ (1990)
Ustaad/ / (1989)
Dav Pech/ Molester/ (1989)
Nishane Bazi/ / (1989)
Bade Ghar Ki Beti/ Lala (Money-lender)/ (1989)
Toofan / Bride's Father /1989
Jaadugar/ Pujari/ (1989)
Galiyon Ka Badshah/ / (1989)
Clerk/ / (1989)
Aurat Teri Yehi Kahani/ Poojari/ (1988)
Jeete Hain Shaan Se/ / (1988)
Zalzala/ Mukhiya/ (1988)
Ek Naya Rishta/ Rajiv's relative/ (1988)
Zakhmi Aurat/ Rapist's father/ (1988)
Soorma Bhopali/ / (1988)
Hum Farishte Nahin/ / (1988)
Aakrant/ / (1988)
Raat Ke Andhere Mein/ / (1987)
Daku Hasina/ / (1987)
Marte Dam Tak/ Tiwarilal/ (1987)
Besahara/ / (1987)
Kudrat Ka Kanoon/ Ramu/ (1987)
Thikana/ Man raped his young maid/ (1987)
Kalyug Aur Ramayan/ Jagannath (Stage Director)/ (1987)
Nazrana/ Parvati's Husband/ (1987)
Raaj Dulara/ / (1987)
Maa Beti/ Purshotamlal/ (1986)
Andheri Raat Mein Diya Tere Haath Mein/ / (1986)
Saveray Wali Gaadi/ Pandit/ (1986)
Ghar Sansar/ Money Lender/ (1986)
Karma / / (1986)
Kirayadar/ Advocate Balwant B. Desai/ (1986)
Kala Dhanda Goray Log/ Money Lender/ (1986)
Aap Ke Saath/ Stranger #1 in the city/ (1986)
Piya Milan/ / (1985)
Ek Chitthi Pyar Bhari/ Bhiku/ (1985)
Haqeeqat/ / (1985)
Phaansi Ke Baad/ Loknath, MP/ (1985)
Ghar Dwaar/ Karodimal/ (1985)
Mard/ Lalaji (Father Of Groom)/ (1985)
Ram Teri Ganga Maili/ Pandit/ (1985)
Zindagi Jeene Ke Liye/ / (1984)
Ek Naya Itihas/ / (1984)
Yeh Desh/ Minister/ (1984)
Grahasthi/ Lala/ (1984)
Kanoon Kya Karega/ Pakdulal Mishra/ (1984)
Love Marriage/ Chaubey/ (1984)
Karishmaa/ Man who got wet with hot water/ (1984)
Ram Ki Ganga/ Madhu's patron/ (1984)
Gangvaa/ / (1984)
Ek Nai Paheli/ Upendranath's friend/ (1984)
Sharaabi/ Father of prospective bride/ (1984)
Bhemaa/ Chaubey/ (1984)
Maqsad/ Sharma/ (1984)
Inquilaab/ Education Minister Saraswati Prasad/ (1984)
Nishaan/Lala (1983)
Faraib/ / (1983)
Hum Se Hai Zamana/ Thakur's Munim/ (1983)
Manju/ Amar Singh/ (1983)
Coolie/ Deepa's prospective father-in-law/ (1983)
Painter Babu/ Nekiram (Meera's uncle)/ (1983)
Taqdeer/ Munim Phoolchand/ (1983)
 Kalka (1983 film) / Sevakram
Teri Maang Sitaron Se Bhar Doon/ Popat Lal (Jeweller)/ (1982)
Dharam Kanta/ Merchant weapon/ (1982)
Teesri Aankh/ Sagar's victim/ (1982)
Apna Bana Lo/ Drunk/ (1982)
Angoor/ Chhedilal/ (1982)
Sheetla Mata/ Teja Singh/ (1981)
Fiffty Fiffty/ Bihari's brother/ (1981)
Shradhanjali/ Cremation In Charge/ (1981)
Khuda Kasam/ Pandit/ (1981)
Haqdaar/ / (1981)
Rocky/ Man at the courtesan's place/ (1981)
Krodhi/ Aarti's uncle/ (1981)
Bulundi/ College Lecturer/ (1981)
Maan Abhiman/ Munim/ (1980)
Patita/ Din Dayal Dubey/ (1980)
Payal Ki Jhankaar/ Shivram - Shyama's uncle/ (1980)
Bin Maa Ke Bachche/ Gopal/ (1980)
Hum Paanch/ / (1980)
Be-Reham/ Banke Lal/ (1980)
Do Premee/ / (1980)
Nagin Aur Suhagan/ Thakur Zoravar Singh/ (1979)
Meri Biwi Ki Shaadi/ Banwari/ (1979)
Salaam Memsaab/ Panditji/ (1979)
Naiyya/ Vaid Makardhwaj/ (1979)
Ghar Ki Laaj/ Manphool's Uncle/ (1979)
Saanch Ko Aanch Nahin/ Ganeshi (Murli's dad)/ (1979)
Manzil/ Dharam Chand/ (1979)
Bin Phere Hum Tere/ Mukand Bihari/ (1979)
Tyaag Patra/ / (1978)
Chor Ho To Aisa/ Pure Hindi speaking donor/ (1978)
Damaad/ Pandit Sunder Lal/ (1978)
Rahu Ketu/ / (1978)
Ram Kasam/ / (1978)
Ghar/ Banwari Lal/ (1978)
Kaala Aadmi/ / (1978)
Chakravyuha (1978 film) // Ayurvedic Medicine Seller/ 1978
Main Tulsi Tere Aangan Ki/ Subramaniam (Accountant)/ (1978)
Azaad/ Mr. Mishra/ (1978)
Shirdi Ke Sai Baba/ Groom's dad/ (1977)
Ananda Ashram/ Mukhiya- Village Chief/ (1977)
Tinku/ Balloon Seller/ (1977)
Dream Girl/ / (1977)
Khel Khilari Ka/ Nandan/ (1977)
Immaan Dharam/ Lawyer (in Gullu Miya's Case)/ (1977)
Lagaam/ / (1976)
Tapasya/ / (1976)
Chitchor/ Postman/ (1976)
Dus Numbri/ / (1976)
Chhoti Si Baat/ Gurnaam (Garage owner)/ (1976)
Ek Gaon Ki Kahani/ Banvarilal/ (1975)
Zinda Dil/ / (1975)
Sanyasi/ Munimji/ (1975)
Mausam/ Dinu/ (1975)
Aandhi/ Gurusaran/ (1975)
The Cheat/ / (1974)
Roti Kapada Aur Makaan/ Lala (grocer)/ (1974)
Imtihan/ Professor Brij Bhushan 'Punditji' Chaturvedi/ (1974)
Mere Gharib Nawaz/ Akhtar Miyan/ (1973)
Saudagar/ / (1973)
Banarasi Babu/ Fernandes/ (1973)
Ek Khiladi Bawan Pattey/ / (1972)
Raja Jani/ Bagla Seth's Servant/ (1972)
Samadhi/ Jr Artist/ (1972)
Rakhi Aur Hathkadi/ Pandit - Kidnapper which stole Janaki/ (1972)
Shaadi Ke Baad/ Advocate Govind/ (1972)
Babul Ki Galiyaan/ / (1972)
Apna Desh/ / (1972)
Sanjog Dubey/ (Guest Appearance)/ (1972)
Piya Ka Ghar/ Pandit/ (1972)
Lagan/ Kalpana's dad/ (1971)
Main Sunder Hoon/ Chicken Owner/ (1971)
Bikhare Moti/ / (1971)
Samaj Ko Badal Dalo/ Kalicharan/ (1970)
Pagla Kahin Ka/ Pinto/ (1970)
Pehchan/ Sunder/ (1970)
Humjoli/ Shyama's Uncle/ (1970)
Yaadgaar/ Chand Seth/ (1970)
Tum Haseen Main Jawan/ Zorawar Singh/ (1970)
Khilona/ / (1970)
Do Bhai/ / (1969)
Jeene Ki Raah/ Raghunandan's dad/ (1969)
Prince Dancer who got tied up (1969)
Aradhana/ The Inn keeper/ (1969)
Jhuk Gaya Aasmaan/ Bengali Babu/ (1968)
Sapnon Ka Saudagar/ Ramu (gambler)/ (1968)
Teesri Kasam/ Birju/ (1966)
Gaban/ Bhagat - Paanwala/ (1966)
Aaye Din Bahar Ke/ / (1966)
Goswami Tulsidas/ Man who doubts Tulsidas/ (1964)
Bidesiya/ / (1963)
Bin Badal Barsaat/ / (1963)
Aarti/ / (1962)
Hamari Yaad Aayegi/ / (1961)
Passport/ Dubey - Employee at Bhagwandas Jewellers/ (1961)
Ramu Dada/ / (1961)
Ardhangini/ Babloo's dad/ (1959)
Haria/ / (1958)
Dekh Kabira Roya/ / (1957)
Bhabhi/ Abdul Majid's Son/ (1957)
Ab Dilli Dur Nahin/ Ram Bharose/ (1957)
Kath Putli/ / (1957)
Jaldeep/ / (1956)
Seema/ Banke Lal/ (1955)
Pehli Jhalak/ Paan Shop Owner/ (1955)
Mr. & Mrs. '55/ Doctor/ (1955)
Patita/ Bhiku Chacha/ (1953)
Daag/ Hira/ (1952)
Sunehre Din/ Cameo appearance in song "Hum mast dilon ko lekar"/(1949)

References

External links
 

1924 births
1993 deaths
Indian male radio actors
Male actors in Hindi cinema
20th-century Indian male actors